Arthur-Virden is a provincial electoral division in the Canadian province of Manitoba.  It was created by redistribution in 1989, combining the former constituencies of Arthur and Virden.

Arthur-Virden is located in the southwestern corner of the province.  It is bordered to the north by Riding Mountain, to the east by Spruce Woods, to the west by the province of Saskatchewan and to the south by the American state of North Dakota.

Communities in the riding include Virden, Elkhorn, Oak Lake, Hartney, Deloraine, Melita, Reston and Boissevain.

In 1999, the average family income was $41,338, and the unemployment rate was 4.80%.  The riding is primarily agrarian, with agriculture accounting for 32% of its industry.

Ten per cent of the Arthur-Virden's residents list German as their ethnic background.  The riding has one of the highest rates of senior citizens in the province, at 19.7% of the total.

Arthur-Virden, and the two ridings from which it was formed, have been Progressive Conservative seats since 1953.

List of provincial representatives

Election results

 
|Progressive Conservative
| Doyle Piwniuk
|align="right"| 3,137
|align="right"| 68.20
|align="right"| +2.23
|align="right"|15,355.65

|- bgcolor="white"
!align="right" colspan=3|Total valid votes
!align="right"|4,600
!align="right"|100.00
!align="right"|
|align="right"|
|- bgcolor="white"
!align="right" colspan=3|Rejected and declined votes
!align="right"|10
!align="right"|
!align="right"|
|align="right"|
|- bgcolor="white"
!align="right" colspan=3|Turnout
!align="right"|4,610
!align="right"|33.55
!align="right"|
|align="right"|
|- bgcolor="white"
!align="right" colspan=3|Electors on the lists
!align="right"|13,739
!align="right"|
!align="right"|
|align="right"|

|}

^ Change not based on redistributed results

Previous boundaries

References

Former provincial electoral districts of Manitoba
1989 establishments in Manitoba